Łukasz Jarosiński (born 7 October 1988) is a Polish former footballer who played as a goalkeeper and current goalkeeping coach.

Club career 
Łukasz Jarosiński spent his youth years with Górnik/Zagłębie Wałbrzych until December 2006. In January 2007, the 19-year-old signed for Wisła Kraków. On 19 May 2007 he made his debut for the club, when he played the full 90 minutes in the 0–4 loss against Dyskobolia Grodzisk in the 28th round of the 2006–07 Ekstraklasa season. This was his only match for the first team. After the establishment of the Młoda Ekstraklasa, he played 25 matches for Wisła Kraków ME and even scored a goal.

In the 2008–09 season, Jarosinski went on loan to fourth division side Polonia/Sparta Świdnica, and played 16 matches for the club. In the 2010–11 season, he went on loan to second division side Górnik Polkowice, but did not feature for the club. In the 2011–12 season, he went on loan to third division side MKS Kluczbork, and played one match.

On 15 March 2012, Jarosinski  then went on a free transfer to Norwegian first division club Alta IF, where he became the first choice goalkeeper. He won the player of the year award in the club in both the 2012 and 2013 season. After the club was relegated to the second division in 2012, he helped them win promotion in the 2013 season.

On 17 December 2013, Jarosinski signed a three year contract with Norwegian first division club Hønefoss BK.

On 31 July 2015, Jarosinski was signed by Norwegian Tippeligaen club Strømsgodset Toppfotball for an undisclosed sum, as a replacement for reserve goalkeeper Anders Gundersen, who had gone on loan.

On 18 January 2017 Jarosinski was signed by then 2. divisjon club Hamarkameratene, where he helped to win the club promotion to the Norwegian First Division. At Hamarkameratene he regularly started as the first choice goalkeeper.

He then joined the Faroese champions KÍ Klaksvík for half a season.

After an unsuccessful return to HamKam, on 30 December 2021 he became the goalkeeping coach for Vålerenga.

Career statistics

References

1988 births
Living people
Polish footballers
Polish expatriate footballers
Wisła Kraków players
Alta IF players
Hønefoss BK players
Strømsgodset Toppfotball players
Hamarkameratene players
KÍ Klaksvík players
Ekstraklasa players
I liga players
Norwegian First Division players
Norwegian Second Division players
Faroe Islands Premier League players
People from Wałbrzych
Sportspeople from Lower Silesian Voivodeship
Polish expatriate sportspeople in Norway
Expatriate footballers in Norway
Polish expatriate sportspeople in the Faroe Islands
Expatriate footballers in the Faroe Islands
Association football goalkeepers